Helmut Maandi (5 June 1906, Sikeldi (now Rapla Parish), Kreis Harrien, Governorate of Estonia – 27 October 1990) was an Estonian statesman. He was chairman of the Chamber of Agricultural Workmen and Small Landowners and served as Secretary of State of Estonia from 1944 to 1945 and from 1949 to 1953, although in exile in Sweden.

References

1906 births
1990 deaths
People from Rapla Parish
People from Kreis Harrien
Settlers' Party politicians
Members of the Riigikogu, 1932–1934
University of Tartu alumni
Estonian World War II refugees
Estonian emigrants to Sweden